Scopula comes  is a moth of the  family Geometridae. It was described by Prout in 1927. It is found on São Tomé and Príncipe.

References

Moths described in 1927
comes
Taxa named by Louis Beethoven Prout
Moths of Africa